An injector, or steam injector, a pump-like device without moving parts.

Injector may also refer to:

 Fuel injector, a device used in many modern vehicle engines for fuel injection
 Injector pen, a device for injecting medication under the skin
 Injector torch, a type of welding and cutting torch in oxy-fuel welding and cutting
 Jet injector, a medical hypodermic device
 Sample injector, a device used to inject samples into chromatography apparatuses
 Injector, a character from the Beast Wars toyline
 A program used to perform DLL injection

See also 
 Injection (disambiguation)
 Ejector (disambiguation)